No. 160 (Bomber Reconnaissance) Squadron was a Royal Canadian Air Force squadron that was active during the Second World War. It was primarily used in an anti-submarine role and flew the Consolidated Canso before disbanding on June 15, 1945.

References

See also
 RCAF Eastern Air Command

Royal Canadian Air Force squadrons (disbanded)

Military units and formations of Canada in World War II